Antonius Cornelissen (born 24 January 1964) is a Dutch retired footballer who played for, among others, NAC Breda and RBC Roosendaal.

Cornelissen was born in Breda. While at NAC Breda he won the 1990 Eerste Divisie Player of the Year award.

Honours

Individual
 NAC Breda
 Top scorer Eerste Divisie 1990–91: 35 goals

References

External links
VI Profile

1964 births
Living people
Dutch footballers
Dutch expatriate footballers
Association football forwards
Footballers from Breda
Sparta Rotterdam players
NAC Breda players
De Graafschap players
RBC Roosendaal players
RKC Waalwijk players
FC Eindhoven players
Eredivisie players
Eerste Divisie players
Expatriate footballers in Belgium
Dutch expatriate sportspeople in Belgium